Munteni-Buzău is a commune in Ialomița County, Muntenia, Romania, composed of a single village, Munteni-Buzău. It is situated at 89 km from Bucharest on the European highway E60. In 2002, it had a population of 3,867 people and its neighbors are the town Căzănești and the Sărățeni commune. The mayor is Gheorghe Soare of the National Liberal Party.

References

Communes in Ialomița County
Localities in Muntenia